Mazzantini is an Italian surname. Notable people with the surname include:

 Andrea Mazzantini (born 1968), Italian footballer
 Margaret Mazzantini (born 1961), Italian writer and actress
 Matteo Mazzantini (born 1976), Italian rugby union player

Italian-language surnames